Rechukka Pagatichukka is a 1959 Indian Telugu-language swashbuckler film, produced by N. Trivikrama Rao and directed by Kamalakara Kameswara Rao. It stars N. T. Rama Rao, Sowcar Janaki and S. V. Ranga Rao, with music composed by T. V. Raju. The film was simultaneously made in Tamil as Raja Sevai.

Plot

Telugu version

Once upon a time, there was a king Vijayarayalu, who rules Vijayapuri, and his wife, Sumathi Devi. On the occasion of their only son's birthday, Vijayarayalu gets an invitation from Emperor Veera Raghava (C.S.R.), who is innocent and cowardly. Taking this as an advantage, his younger brother Vikram Simha takes the reins of the kingdom. He cheats the daughter of the tribal leader Puli Dora. Because of their fear, he called for this meeting to eliminate them. At the same time, the tribal leader Puli Dora brings his pregnant daughter Gowri to the court. Insulted, Gowri publicly kills herself. Puli Dora furiously says that he will take revenge. Vikram asks to arrest Pulidora, Vijayarayulu objects for this injustice and allows the tribals to go. Vikram arrests Vijayarayulu and sets fire to his palace. The Queen escapes with her son. Puli Dora helps Vijayarayalu to escape. Army commander Dharmadeva chases Puli Dora and Vijayarayalu. Puli Dora makes Dharmadeva believe that Vijayarayalu is dead and he changes himself as Rechukka. On Dharmadeva's way back, he finds Vijayarayalu's son and takes him to his house. Sumathi learns of this and joins as a caretaker to the baby. The child is named as Vijay Kumar. After some time, Veera Raghava is blessed with a baby girl. Vikram tries to kill the baby, but Vijayarayalu rescues her and brings her up as his daughter.

Years roll by, Vijay Kumar becomes a great warrior and gets the appreciation of King Veera Raghava. On the occasion of Vijaya Dasami, the King announces Vikram's son Uttar Kumar as the future king. Knowing this, Rechukka kidnaps him. Vikram orders Vijay Kumar to catch Rechukka within six months otherwise he will be beheaded. Vijay Kumar starts along with his friend Ayomayam in search of Rechukka. Ayomayam names Vijay Kumar as Pagatichukka. Once Vijay Kumar saves the princess and they fall in love. On hearing this, Puli Dora takes them to Rechukka, Vijaya Kumar shows his valor and he was felicitated. Ayomayam is jailed. When Rechukka leaves for the border of the country, Pagatichukka relieves Ayomayam and Uttar Kumar from tribal captivity along with the princess and sends word to Rechhukka to come and release his daughter if capable. Rechukka and Pagatichukka come across each other and Rechukka is defeated. Vijay Kumar arrests and takes him to the fort. Sumathi identifies him as her husband and reveals that Vijay Kumar is their son. Vijay Kumar also listens to everything and says sorry to father. Vijayarayalu feels proud that his son has become a greater warrior than him and asks him to protect the princess who is the actual heir to the dynasty. At the same time, Vikram arrives, arrests them all and presents them in the court. In the court, Vijayarayalu brings out all the atrocities of Vikram. At last Rechukka and Pagatichukka stamp out Vikram and gives back his daughter to the King. Finally, the movie ends on a happy note with the marriage of Vijay Kumar and the Princess.

Tamil version

Vijayavarman is the chief security officer of King Mahibalan. Mahibalan's younger brother Vikraman captures the kingdom. Vikraman goes for hunting one day. There he meets a girl, Gowri, who is the daughter of the chief of the mountain tribe, Bommanna. He promises that he will marry her and makes love to Gowri. Vikraman returns to the palace and calls for a meeting of local chiefs as he is afraid that the mountain tribes may come and take revenge. In the meantime, Gowri becomes pregnant. Bommanna brings her to the king's court while the meeting with local chiefs was in progress. He demands that Vikraman takes Gowri as his wife. But Vikraman feigns ignorance. Gowri commits suicide in the court itself. Bommanna swears that he will take revenge. Vikraman orders his soldiers to arrest Bommanna, but Vijayavarman objects. Bommanna escapes. Vikraman imprisons Vijayavarman. Bommanna rescues him from the prison and both plan to overthrow Vikraman. The rest of the story deals with many twists and turns.

Cast

Telugu version

 N. T. Rama Rao as Vijay Kumar
 Sowcar Janaki as Rajakumari
 S. V. Ranga Rao as Vijaya Rayalu
 V. Nagayya as Dharma Devudu
 Rajanala as Uttara Kumarudu
 R. Nageswara Rao as Vikram Simhudu
 Relangi as Ayyomayam
 C.S.R. as Maharaju Veera Raghava
 Padmanabham as Takku
 Peketi Sivaram as Bhayankara Simhudu
 Balakrishna as Tikku
 Mahankali Venkaiah as Puli Dora
 Kannamba as Sumathi Devi
 S. Varalakshmi as Gowri
 Girija
 Chaya Devi
 Mohana

Tamil version
List adapted from the database of Film News Anandan and from the film's song book.

Male cast
N. T. Rama Rao
S. V. Ranga Rao
T. S. Balaiah
P. S. Veerappa
T. R. Ramachandran
V. Nagayya
O. A. K. Thevar
Rajanala
Mahankali Venkaiah
Master Balaji

Female cast
Sowcar Janaki
P. Kannamba
Girija
Mohana
Kusalakumari
Jayalakshmi
Guest artist
S. Varalakshmi

Production 
The film was produced by N. Thrivikrama Rao, who also wrote the story, under the banner Swasthi Sri Pictures and was directed by Kamalakara Kameswara Rao. The dialogues were penned by Thanjai N. Ramaiah Dass. Cinematography was handled by M. A. Rahman while the editing was done by G. D. Joshi. A. Krishnan was in charge of audiography while the recordings were done by K. Harinath. Vembatti Satyam handled the choreography and the still photography was done by R. N. Nagaraja Rao.

The film was simultaneously produced in Telugu and Tamil and in Kannada with the title Rajashekara.

Soundtrack 

Music composed by T. V. Raju. Lyrics were written by Samudrala Jr. 
Telugu Soundtrack

the lyrics were penned by Thanjai N. Ramaiah Dass. Playback singers are P. Leela, S. Janaki, P. Susheela, A. P. Komala, Thiruchi Loganathan, A. L. Raghavan, Ghantasala and S. C. Krishnan.

Tamil Soundtrack

References

External links 
 
 

1950s Telugu-language films
1950s Tamil-language films
Indian historical adventure films
Films scored by T. V. Raju
Films directed by Kamalakara Kameswara Rao
1950s historical adventure films
Indian multilingual films
1950s multilingual films